is a consumer electronics brand owned and used by various companies in different regions of the world. American and other regions are owned by Chicago-based Aiwa Corporation. Towada Audio based in Tokyo owns the rights to the brand in Japan and other countries, and has been manufacturing Aiwa-branded products since 2017. In Mexico and other countries in Latin America, the rights are owned by Audio Mobile Americas, S.A.

Aiwa was founded in 1951 and was once a globally well-regarded brand known for making quality audio products such as speakers, boomboxes and stereo systems. It was the market leader in several product categories. Aiwa created the first Japanese cassette tape recorder in 1964. The company was listed on the Tokyo Stock Exchange from October 1961 until September 2003.

The company became unprofitable in the late 1990s, and was fully bought by Sony in 2003. Aiwa was then rebranded as a new youth-focused division of Sony, but it was unsuccessful and the brand was discontinued by 2006. In 2015, an American audio company known as Hale Devices, Inc. was granted the rights to the brand name, with the company renaming itself Aiwa Corporation under which it produces audio equipment.

History

Mitsuo Ikejiri served as president until 1969.

The company was a leading manufacturer of audio products, including headphone stereos, minicomponent stereo systems, portable stereo systems, minidisc players, CD and cassette players, and car stereo systems throughout the 1970s, 1980s, and 1990s. Nearly 86 percent of company revenues were derived from such audio products. 12 percent came from products such as televisions and VCRs, and the remaining two percent from computer peripherals and other life products.

Aiwa marketed Japan's first boombox, the TPR-101, in 1968, as well as the first cassette deck, TP-1009. In 1980, Aiwa created the world's first personal stereo recorder, TP-S30. Despite Sony being the major shareholder, healthy competition between the two brands was believed to be profitable. In 1990, Aiwa created the HP-J7 earbuds, designed to be vertically inserted into the ear. In 1993, the first CD+G-compatible portable CD player, the XP-80G, was made.

Apart from audio products, Aiwa also has been present in other industries. The company also made and sold video products such as VCRs, color televisions, DVD players, and digital satellite television tuners. Aiwa was also involved in the production of computer peripheral devices, such as modems, terminal adapters, and speakers, and what the company termed "life amenity products," such as air cleaners and humidifiers. In 1995, it released a PHS mobile phone, called the PT-H50, which was made for the DDI Pocket network in Japan. That same year, an electric toothbrush, the HA-C10, was released.

Aiwa manufactured more than 89 percent of its output outside Japan, with a heavy emphasis on the lower-cost southeast Asian nations of Singapore, Malaysia, and Indonesia. The company was also heavily dependent on overseas sales, with more than 80 percent of total revenues being generated outside Japan, with 43 percent in North and South America, 25 percent in Europe, and 13 percent in areas of Asia outside Japan and in other regions.

Although not then officially an affiliated company of consumer electronics giant Sony Corporation, by 1982, Sony had a 54.6% stake in the company, effectively giving it a majority control.

With growing competition throughout the late 1990s, the company slid towards bankruptcy. In March 2001, the company's president, Masayoshi Morimoto, announced the halving of its workforce, following a second consecutive loss–making year.

Acquisition by Sony

The troubled company was then fully purchased by Sony Corporation. As of December 31, 2003, Aiwa ceased to be a separate company and became a wholly owned division of Sony.

In January 2004, Sony announced the rebranding and relaunch of Aiwa as a "youth focused, PC-centric" electronics brand. A new logo was presented to the world's media along with a statement of Sony's intention to invest in and "revitalize" the Aiwa brand. The direction proposed was to capitalize on the growing trend among personal-computer-literate teenagers and young adults to use their PCs for all forms of entertainment (television, films, music, chat). It was also used to expand in markets where Sony is not as strong.

However the new direction of Aiwa under Sony did not meet consumer and sales expectations. On January 21, 2005, new product development ended, and by 2006, Aiwa products were discontinued and no longer sold in the market. Sony announced the termination of the brand entirely on May 14, 2008.

As of January 2014, the Aiwa website still existed to provide customer-support telephone numbers for some territories and regions, but it also contained many broken links and blank pages. In other regions, such as Europe, it redirected to a page on the Sony website stating that the Aiwa website had closed.

Aiwa Co., Ltd. (2017–) 
On April 11, 2017, Japanese audio equipment manufacturer Towada Audio announced that it acquired the Aiwa brand rights from Sony and would produce Aiwa-branded audio and record player products. In 2021, Aiwa partnered with 5,000 retailers in India to relaunch in the country.

Aiwa Corporation (Chicago, USA)
From a public statement released by Aiwa Co., Ltd (Tokyo, Japan), "Aiwa Corporation (Chicago, USA) are in not in any way related to us, Aiwa Co., Ltd (Tokyo, Japan) or Aiwa Japan since 1951 to date".

Products 

Products of Aiwa include music centres, Hi-Fi, compact disc players, boombox radios and portable CD players. Aiwa is currently also making home appliances, including air conditioners, refrigerators and washing machines.

HS-P06 stereo cassette players debuted in 1984. Shipped with TU-01 FM/AM Stereo Tuner Pack 

Aiwa's portable CD players are equipped with a so-called E.A.S.S. G.P. (Electronic Anti-Shock System) feature with the aim of allowing smooth, skip-free Audio CD playback despite of damaged media and external shaking.

Logos
The first logo of the company contained AIWA in capital letters, in use until 1991. The second logo changed the font to a lowercase one, as aiwa. In 2004, after the acquisition by Sony, the logo was rebranded as part of Sony's efforts to 'revitalize' the brand, and was in use until the brand's retirement in 2006. Since the brand's resurrection in 2015, the second (1991–2003) logo is back in use. All logos were colored red.

Gallery

See also
 List of companies of Japan
 List of defunct consumer brands
 List of electronics brands
 List of electronics companies
 Sony Corporation shareholders and subsidiaries

References

External links

 Aiwa Corporation (USA)
 Aiwa Co., Ltd. (Japan)
 Aiwa site as a Sony division
 Aiwa closure message
 Aiwa India

Japanese companies established in 1951
Audio equipment manufacturers of Japan
Defunct consumer brands
Defunct companies of Japan
Japanese brands
Manufacturing companies based in Chicago
Manufacturing companies based in Tokyo
Japanese companies established in 2017
Electronics companies established in 1951
Electronics companies disestablished in 2002
Re-established companies
Sony subsidiaries
2002 mergers and acquisitions
Video equipment manufacturers